Thiruvananthapuram Municipal Corporation (തിരുവനന്തപുരം നഗരസഭ) is the oldest and the largest (by area and population) city corporation in the Kerala state of India. It is the municipal corporation that administrates the city of Thiruvananthapuram (Trivandrum), the capital of Kerala. The city corporation is spread over 214.86 km2 with 100 wards and a population of 9,57,730 inhabitants. It includes the Legislative Assembly constituencies of Thiruvananthapuram, Vattiyoorkavu, Nemom, Kazhakkoottam and 5 wards of the Kovalam constituency. Mayor Arya Rajendran is presently the youngest mayor in the country belonging to the Communist Party of India (Marxist).

History
The conservancy department was started in Thiruvananthapuram in 1877 during the reign of the king Ayilyam Thirunal of the Travancore kingdom. Following to this, the town was divided into 5 divisions, namely Kottaykkakam (Fort), Chalai, Sreevaraham, Manacaud and Pettah.

The first president of the Committee was Dewan Peshkar Iraviperur Pillai. There were 19 members in the committee. The Thiruvananthapuram Municipality came into existence in 1920. After two decades, during the reign of Sree Chithira Thirunal Balarama Varma, Thiruvananthapuram Municipality was converted into Municipal Corporation on 30 October 1940.

Administration
The city corporation is ruled by the council of 100 members, headed by the Mayor. The Mayor (elected from among the councilors) chairs the Council meetings, and is responsible for the overall, supervision and control of the administrative functions of the Municipal Corporation.

The Council is composed of all elected councilors. The administration of the TMC vests in the Council. The term of office of the council is five years. The TMC through the Council has all the powers, authority and responsibilities of the Government, to enable it to function as an institution of self-government in respect of the matters entrusted to it. The Council, constitute Standing Committees for exercising its powers, discharging such duties or performing such functions, as is provided for in the Kerala Municipalities Act.

The Deputy Mayor is the Chairman of the Finance Standing Committee and also presides over the Council meetings during the absence of the Mayor. The Secretary of the TMC is an officer appointed by the Government. The law and order of the city is handled by the Trivandrum City Police Commissioner. The total police strength in the city including the Armed Reserve camp at Nandavanam and the SAP camp at Peroorkada, is about 4,500.

The corporation was divided into 24 wards covering an area of 30.66 km² in 1940. Through years, the city corporation has grown up to 100 wards, and now the Thiruvananthapuram Corporation Council is the second largest democratically elected body in Kerala after the Legislative Assembly .

O

Revenue sources 

The following are the Income sources for the Corporation from the Central and State Government.

Revenue from taxes  
Following is the Tax related revenue for the corporation.

 Property tax.
 Profession tax.
 Entertainment tax.
 Grants from Central and State Government like Goods and Services Tax.
 Advertisement tax.

Revenue from non-tax sources 

Following is the Non Tax related revenue for the corporation.

 Water usage charges.
 Fees from Documentation services.
 Rent received from municipal property.
 Funds from municipal bonds.

Wards of Thiruvananthapuram Corporation

The 100 wards of the Thiruvananthapuram Corporation and their councilors are listed below in the alphabetical order of the ward name.

Corporation Election 2010

Corporation Election 2015

Political performance

Corporation Election 2020

References

Official website: - https://tmc.lsgkerala.gov.in/

External links 
 Corporation Official Website

Municipal corporations in Kerala
1940 establishments in India
Government of Thiruvananthapuram